Wenzell Baird Bryant (December 12, 1927 – November 13, 2008) was an American filmmaker. He was well known in documentary circles for his hand-held ability to almost instantaneously capture live action as it was happening. Hired as the cameraman on Gimme Shelter, the Albert Maysles film of The Rolling Stones 1969 American Tour, Baird caught on camera the fatal stabbing of concertgoer Meredith Hunter by Hells Angel Alan Passaro at the Altamont Free Concert in December 1969.

Born in Columbus, Indiana, his parents were Dr. William Bryant, a surgeon, and Daisy née Mortimer. On his mother's side he is a descendant of the Revolutionary War patriot Famous Mortimer and also of the Revolutionary War heroine Charlotte Est Wenzell. Bryant attended Deep Springs College in Big Pine, California, and graduated from Harvard University. In the 1950s he lived in Paris and was a writer, living with William S. Burroughs, Allen Ginsberg, and Jack Kerouac. Bryant wrote Play This Love With Me (1955). Fluent in French, he also wrote the first English translation of Pauline Réage's erotic novel Story of O.

He began his filmmaking career in the early sixties shooting The Seducers (1962), Greenwich Village Story (1963), The Cool World (1963) and Celebration at Big Sur (1971). He worked on Easy Rider (1969), filming the famous LSD scene with Dennis Hopper in a New Orleans cemetery. He later said that filming was "chaotic" at that point, and several of the crew had quit. "I showed up with my camera, and nobody else was there." He also worked on the Academy Award-winning film, Broken Rainbow (1985), a documentary about the Navajo, and Heart of Tibet (1991), a film about the Dalai Lama. He was a practicing Tibetan Buddhist, and followed Chögyam Trungpa when he introduced Tibetan Buddhism to the west in Boulder, Colorado.

Bryant died in Hemet, California, on November 13, 2008.

References 

2008 deaths
Beat Generation writers
American cinematographers
Deep Springs College alumni
Harvard University alumni
People from Indiana
1927 births